Los Pinos River is a tributary of the San Juan River in southern Colorado and northern New Mexico in the United States.  The stream flows from a source near Weminuche Pass in the San Juan Mountains of Colorado to a confluence with the San Juan River at Navajo Lake in San Juan County, New Mexico.

The river is impounded by the Vallecito Dam.

The name Los Pinos is Spanish for "the pines," and, in fact, the river is known locally as the Pine River.

See also

 List of rivers of Colorado
 List of rivers of New Mexico

References

External links

Rivers of Colorado
Rivers of New Mexico
San Juan Mountains (Colorado)
Rivers of Hinsdale County, Colorado
Rivers of La Plata County, Colorado
Rivers of San Juan County, New Mexico
Tributaries of the Colorado River in Colorado
Tributaries of the Colorado River in New Mexico